C12orf66 is a protein that in humans is encoded by the C12orf66 gene. The C12orf66 protein is one of four proteins in the KICSTOR protein complex which negatively regulates mechanistic target of rapamycin complex 1 (mTORC1) signaling.

Gene 
C12orf66 is located on the minus strand in the locus 12q14.2. C12orf66 variant 1 is 36 Mbp in length spanning the base pairs 64,186,312 - 64,222,296 on chromosome 12. There are 3 total C12orf66 transcript variants. C12orf66 variant 1 is the longest with 4 exons. C12orf66 variant 2 has a shortened exon 1 and is missing exon 4 compared to variant 1. C12orf66 variant 3 is missing exon 4.

Expression 
In humans, C12orf66 has higher than average expression in a number of tissues such as endocrine glands as well as lymphoid tissues and cells. Additionally, C12orf66 expression is increased in a number of cancers including leukemia, breast cancer, cervical cancer, and a number of gastrointestinal related cancers. C12orf66 expression is higher earlier in development. A number of experiments using different human embryonic stem cell lines, oocytes, as well as erythroblasts found C12orf66 expression was increased in these cells earlier in development and expression decreased as these cells became more differentiated. Additionally, expression of C12orf66 in fetal organs is higher than C12orf66 expression in the same adult organs.

Protein 

The human C12orf66 protein is 446 amino acids in length with a molecular weight of 50kdal . C12orf66 contains the domain of unknown function 2003 (DUF2003) from amino acids 10-444. The DUF2003 is characterized by a series of alpha helices and beta sheets.

Function 
C12orf66 is part of a larger protein complex called KICSTOR. KICSTOR is a complex of four proteins coded by the genes KPTN, ITFG2, C12orf66, and SZT2. The KICSTOR complex plays a role in regulating mTORC1 signaling. mTORC1 activates protein translation when the cell has sufficient amounts amino acids and energy. This ensures cell growth and proliferation occurs in ideal cellular environments. KICSTOR recruits the protein complex GATOR1, a negative regulator of mTORC1, to the correct location on the lysosome where mTORC1 signaling occurs. In addition to the localization of GATOR1 to the lysosome, KICSTOR is also necessary for the regulation of mTORC1 signaling by amino acid or glucose deprivation. Normally, amino acid or glucose deprivation inhibits mTORC1 signaling. However, loss of any one protein in the four protein KICSTOR complex resulted in a lack of inhibition of mTORC1 by amino acid or glucose deprivation and increased mTORC1 signaling. Thus, KICSTOR is a negative regulator of mTORC1 signaling that functions by localizing GATOR1 to the lysosomal surface as well inhibiting mTORC1 during periods of amino acid or glucose deprivation. How the KICSTOR complex  directly inhibits mTORC1 as well as senses amino acid or glucose deprivation remains to be elucidated.

Clinical Significance 
Loss of the genomic locus 12q14 which contains the human protein encoding gene C12orf66 is linked to a number of developmental delays and neurodevelopment disorders such as macrocephaly. Additionally, one study found the level of C12orf66 expression is down-regulated in colorectal cancer. In this study, the amount of C12orf66 down-regulation along with the expression of a number of other genes were used as an accurate indicator of clinical outcome in patients with colorectal cancer. Thus, the level of C12orf66 gene expression reflected the survivability of these patients.

Protein-Protein Interactions 
C12orf66 interacts with the three proteins of the KICSTOR complex coded by the genes KPTN, ITFG2, and SZT2 as well as GATOR1. Additionally, C12orf66 is predicted to interact with KRAS, DEPDC5, and C7orf60. These interactions were detected by high throughput affinity capture chromatography.

Homologs 
C12orf66 is a highly conserved protein with a large number of orthologs and no known paralogs. The list of C12orf66 orthologs includes mammals, birds, reptiles, amphibians, fish, marine worms, mollusks, insects, and fungi.

References

Uncharacterized proteins